"Raining in My Heart" is a song recorded by Buddy Holly on October 21, 1958 at the Pythian Temple on West 70th Street in New York City, with the orchestral backing by Dick Jacobs. The music and lyrics are written by the songwriting team of Felice Bryant and Boudleaux Bryant.  It was released as a single on Coral Records in 1959, peaking at number 88 on the Billboard chart as the B-side of "It Doesn't Matter Anymore". This recording was included on Buddy Holly's first "greatest hits" compilation album, The Buddy Holly Story, that was released in March 1959.

Leo Sayer cover
"Raining in My Heart" was also a 1978 hit for Leo Sayer when his recording of the song peaked at number 21 on the UK Singles Chart and number 47 on the US Billboard Hot 100.  It also reached number 9 on the U.S. Easy Listening chart.

Chart history

Other cover versions
Kitty Kallen - for her album Honky Tonk Angel, Country Songs with a City Flavor (1961).
Bobby Vee - for his album Take Good Care of My Baby (1962).
Johnnie Ray - included in the 5-CD Bear Family Records set Yes Tonight Josephine.
Patti Page - included in the compilation album From Nashville to L.A.: Lost Columbia Masters 1962-1969 (2013).
Skeeter Davis released her tribute album Skeeter Davis Sings Buddy Holly (1967) featuring the song.
Dean Martin - For the Good Times (1971).
The Dave Clark Five covered this song on their 1971 album, The Dave Clark Five Play Good Old Rock & Roll.
Anne Murray did a cover of the song on her album New Kind of Feeling (1979).
Peter Skellern - Still Magic (1980).
Connie Francis released her tribute album With Love to Buddy featuring the song in 1996.
Status Quo on their album Don't Stop in 1996.
In 1996, Hank Marvin did an instrumental of the song on Hank Plays Holly.
Australian blues and root band The Revelators covered the song on their 2000 album, The Adventures of The Amazing Revelators.
Don McLean on his live double album Starry Starry Night in 2001.
Robert Wyatt included a piano based instrumental version on his 2003 album, Cuckooland.
Eric Idle contributed a Spike Jones-esque cover of "Raining in My Heart" for the tribute album, Listen to Me: Buddy Holly released in September 2011.

In popular culture
 In 1968, The Beatles paraphrased the first line of "Raining in My Heart" in their song "Dear Prudence" as "The sun is up [instead of "out"]; the sky is blue."
 Rick Danko covered the song on his 1989 tour as a member of Ringo Starr & His All-Starr Band; he performed it live throughout his solo career.
 This song is referenced in Alvin Stardust's song "I Feel Like Buddy Holly." That song's refrain is: "Well, I feel like Buddy Holly, 'cause it's raining in my heart."

References

External links
 
 

1958 songs
1959 singles
1978 singles
Buddy Holly songs
Leo Sayer songs
Songs written by Felice and Boudleaux Bryant
Songs released posthumously
Coral Records singles
1950s ballads